gDiapers is a diaper company headquartered in Portland, Oregon. The company sells a hybrid diaper, called a gDiaper, that is used with cloth inserts or disposable inserts that can be flushed or composted (wet ones only). An investigation by the Federal Trade Commission in 2014 determined that gDiapers' product claims of having "green" and "eco-friendly" baby products were deceptive and a form of false advertising.

Company history 
gDiapers was founded in 2004 by Australian couple Jason and Kim Graham-Nye when they discovered they would be having a child, and they began looking for an alternative diaper option to reduce the environmental impact of disposable diapers. According to co-founder Jason Graham-Nye, the goal was to create "the world's first hybrid diaper, essentially the best of cloth and disposable" (diapers). In 2010, gDiapers won Green America's People's Choice Award for Green Business of the Year. gDiapers became a Certified B Corporation (Benefit Corporation) in May 2011, and later became a partner of a maternal health organization called Every Mother Counts. Also, gDiapers' Disposable Diaper Inserts are recognized as a Cradle to Cradle Certified (cm) Silver product.

Products 
gDiapers provides reusable and hybrid diapers, as well as other baby products and accessories:
 gPants
 Diaper Bundles
 Disposable Inserts
 Cloth Liners
 Gentle Wipes

FTC investigation 
In January 2014, the Federal Trade Commission issued a complaint that gDiapers was using deceptive claims to market their products as environmentally friendly. The complaint determined terminology such as biodegradable, compostable, eco-friendly, green, and non-plastic were misleading consumers with false representations and marketing of gDiaper products. gDiapers later reached a settlement with the FTC, agreeing to change its marketing of gDiaper products to adhere to the policies of the FTC's Green guides.

International operations 
gDiapers has international offices in the United Kingdom, Australia, and South Korea. gDiapers products are sold in the following countries and regions:
 Canada
 Germany
 South Korea
 United Kingdom/Europe
 United States

References

External links 
 Official Website

Privately held companies based in Oregon
Companies based in Portland, Oregon
2004 establishments in Oregon